Whitney Osuigwe was the defending champion, but lost to Danielle Lao in the quarterfinals.

Mandy Minella won the title, defeating Alexa Glatch in the final, 6–4 6–4.

Seeds

Draw

Finals

Top half

Bottom half

References

Main Draw

RBC Pro Challenge - Singles